One Limassol, otherwise known as simply One, is a high-rise apartment building in Limassol, Cyprus. Construction for the project was meant to begin in early 2016, but was pushed back to November 2017. It has a total of 38 floors and it rises to a height of 170 meters (558 ft.), making it the tallest building in Cyprus. One Tower was designed by Hakim Khennouchi architecte (WKK Architects) and Eraclis Papachristou Architects (Local Architect). Structural design was completed by Buro Happold Engineering and PPA (Local Engineers).  

Due to the complex concave shape which is variable throughout its height, geometry and computational consultants SEAMLEXITY  were utilised to optimise and segregate the skin to doubly curved GRC panels.

Awards

See also 

 List of tallest buildings in Cyprus
 List of tallest buildings in the European Union
 List of tallest buildings in Europe
 Limassol

References

External links
One Limassol - The Pride Of Cyprus

Buildings and structures in Limassol
Architecture in Cyprus
Skyscrapers in Cyprus
Residential skyscrapers

Limassol